Devil is the fourth and final studio album by Michigan post-hardcore band Chiodos, released on April 1, 2014. The album takes its name from the band's definition of the word "Devil."  Returning vocalist Craig Owens explains:

The band has also cited American writer Mitch Albom as a source of inspiration for the album.

This was the first album the band recorded after reuniting with original vocalist Craig Owens and original drummer Derrick Frost, and the first and only album to feature Thomas Erak of The Fall of Troy as lead guitarist after the departure of original lead guitarist Jason Hale. The album was released on April 1, 2014, by Razor & Tie. Several songs and videos are slated to be released leading up to the album's official debut.

The band headlined the Devil's Dance Tour 2014 early in the year in support of the album.

Sales

The album debuted at No. 12 on the Billboard 200, with more than 18,000 copies sold during the first week. As of June 2015, the album has sold more than 100,000 copies worldwide.

Critical reception

At Alternative Press, Jason Pettigrew rated the album four stars out of five, writing that on the release the band "aren't settling for anything less than world domination" because "Producer Dave Bottrill has molded Chiodos's vision into a cohesive arc of power, finesse, quirks and accessibility in equal measures." Pettigrew finished with saying "Watch them make good on their promise." Amy Sciarretto of Outburn rated the album a nine out of a ten, stating that the release "is a full-bodied, dramatic, and richly textured collection of songs that remind us of the Chiodos we knew and love in the late 00s", and that the album has "so much going on with every track on Devil that you will emerge from the listening experience exhausted but enriched." At The Oakland Press, Gary Graff rated the album three stars out of four, saying that "Chiodos is back as it should be and rocking with its characteristic blast-furnace, angst-fueled intensity." Gregory Heaney of AllMusic rated the album three-and-a-half stars out of five, remarking that the release "sees them continuing to move forward again, and although Hale's presence will certainly be missed, fans of the band will find that the return of Frost and Owens more than makes up for the loss."

Track listing

Personnel
Chiodos
 Craig Owens – lead vocals
 Bradley Bell – keyboards, piano, vocals
 Thomas Erak – lead guitar, vocals
 Pat McManaman – rhythm guitar
 Matt Goddard – bass guitar
 Derrick Frost – drums, percussion

Production
 Produced by David Bottrill
 Additional Production and Engineering by Michael Phillips
 Mixed by Josh Wilbur
 Mastered by Brad Blackwood

References

Chiodos albums
2014 albums